Herbert Smith Freehills is an international law firm with headquarters in London, United Kingdom and Sydney, Australia. It was formed on 1 October 2012 by a merger between the United Kingdom-based Herbert Smith, then a member of the "Silver Circle" of leading UK law firms, and Freehills, one of the "Big Six" Australian law firms. , it is the 29th largest law firm in the world by revenue.

Herbert Smith Freehills regards itself as one of the world's most elite and selective law firms, with a particular recognition in dispute resolution. As of 2015 HSF retains the most FTSE 100 clients of all law firms, representing 39 of the 100 companies. It advises the highest number of FTSE 100 clients in United Kingdom Court of Appeal cases.

History

Prior to merger

Herbert Smith

Herbert Smith was established by Norman Herbert Smith in 1882. Its specialisation in the early 20th century was in company flotations and advice to mining companies. Later its work expanded to litigation, mergers, and equity matters. In 2011, revenues were £465 million and profits-per-equity-partner (PEP) were £900,000.

Herbert Smith had a European partnership with the German firm Gleiss Lutz and the Benelux firm Stibbe until 2011. A plan to merge with those firms did not go ahead.

At the time of its merger with Freehills, Herbert Smith had around 240 partners, 1300 lawyers, with offices in Europe, the Middle East and Asia.

Freehills

Freehills was an Australia-based commercial law firm that operated in the Asia-Pacific region. In Australia, it was considered one of the Australian Big Six law firms.

The firm traced its history back to the practices of Clarke & Moule in Melbourne (1853), Stephen Henry Parker in Perth (1868), Bernard Austin Freehill in Sydney (1871), and John Nicholson (Perth) 1896. Predecessors of the firm are notable for having adopted "open" employment policies, hiring Catholics and Jews when many other firms would not. They are also notable for becoming the first major Australian law firm to appoint a female partner, and forming the first national law partnership in Australia.

At the time of its merger with Herbert Smith, Freehills had 190 partners and 800 lawyers. It had four offices in Australia's capital cities, and an office in Singapore. It had associations with various firms across Asia, many of which continue to this day.

Post Merger
Herbert Smith Freehills was born after completing merger in October 2012. The merger involved an immediate financial integration of the firms in a single partnership and profit pool, an unusual structure for these kinds of mergers. The merger was complicated by differing remuneration structures across the firms; with Herbert Smith practicing a lockstep compensation system, while Freehills practised a merit-based compensation system. Freehills also had a greater number of equity partners.

After merging, the firm began practice in Germany. In September 2012 it opened an office in New York City, focused on international dispute resolution work. A South Korean office was opened at Seoul in April 2013. The combined firm also nearly doubled its total number of international secondees in its first year of operations. In November 2015, Herbert Smith Freehills announced the opening of its third office in Germany, Düsseldorf, headed by Clifford Chance's former head of litigation and arbitration practice.

Offices
As of September 2020, HSF has 26 offices in Asia, Australia, Europe, North America and the Middle East. The Seoul and Tokyo offices are staffed by Commonwealth lawyers and do not practice local law. The Tokyo office relies upon a referral arrangement with Japan's 'Big Four' law firms to avoid competing with them for local legal work, and due to difficulties with hiring Japanese attorneys.

References

External links
Herbert Smith Freehills

Law firms of the United Kingdom
Law firms of Australia
Law firms established in 2012
Foreign law firms with offices in Japan
Foreign law firms with offices in the United States
2012 establishments in the United Kingdom
2012 establishments in Australia
Foreign law firms with offices in Hong Kong